Lundrim Hetemi (born 18 February 2000) is a professional footballer who plays as a midfielder for Vejle. Born in Denmark, he represents Albania internationally.

Professional career
A youth product of his hometown club Fredericia, Hetemi joined the youth academy of Vejle in 2018. He signed his first professional contract with the club on 3 June 2019. Hetemi made his professional debut with Vejle in a 4–2 Danish Superliga win loss to AGF on 14 September 2020.

International career
Born in Denmark, Hetemi is of Kosovo Albanian descent. He is a youth international for Albania.

References

External links
 

2000 births
Living people
People from Fredericia
Albanian footballers
Albania youth international footballers
Danish men's footballers
Albanian people of Kosovan descent
Danish people of Albanian descent
Danish people of Kosovan descent
Association football midfielders
Vejle Boldklub players
Danish Superliga players
Danish 1st Division players
Sportspeople from the Region of Southern Denmark